Kiyota (written: 清田) is a Japanese surname. Notable people with the surname include:

, Japanese baseball player
, Japanese long-distance runner
, Japanese psychic

See also
Kiyota-ku, Sapporo, a ward of Sapporo, Hokkaido, Japan

Japanese-language surnames